Misterioso is an album by American jazz drummer-composer Paul Motian, his ninth album overall and third on the Italian Soul Note label. It was released in 1987 and features performances by Motian’s quintet with guitarist Bill Frisell, tenor saxophonists Joe Lovano and Jim Pepper, and bassist Ed Schuller.

Reception
The Allmusic review by Scott Yanow awarded the album 4½ stars, stating: "Although often overlooked, drummer Paul Motian led one of the most inventive jazz bands of the mid-1980s. His quintet, which featured the tenors of Joe Lovano and Jim Pepper, guitarist Bill Frisell and bassist Ed Schuller, could play anything from swinging advanced hard bop and Ornette Coleman-type free bop to spacier improvising. An underrated composer, Motian contributed seven of the nine numbers for this date; the quintet also performs Thelonious Monk's "Misterioso" and "Pannonica." Frisell is featured on "Byablue" (which had earlier been recorded by Keith Jarrett); the two tenors (Pepper doubled on soprano) work together quite well, and the band definitely had its own sound. Of its three recordings, this is a strong one to start with.".

Track listing
 "Misterioso" (Monk) - 6:50  
 "Abacus" - 3:30  
 "Once Around the Park" - 6:48  
 "Gang of Five" - 4:28  
 "Pannonica" (Monk) - 3:45  
 "Folk Song for Rosie" - 5:08
 "Byablue" - 2:20
 "Dance" - 10:14
 "Johnny Broken Wing" - 2:12

All compositions by Paul Motian except as indicated

Personnel
Paul Motian - drums
Bill Frisell - electric guitar
Joe Lovano - tenor saxophone
Jim Pepper - tenor and soprano saxophones
Ed Schuller - bass

References 

1987 albums
Paul Motian albums
Black Saint/Soul Note albums